Kosmos 36 ( meaning Cosmos 36), also known as DS-P1-Yu #1 was a satellite which was used for use in calibrating the Dnestr space surveillance and as a radar calibration target, for tests of anti-ballistic missiles. It was launched by the Soviet Union in 1964 as part of the Dnepropetrovsk Sputnik programme. It was built by the Yuzhnoye Design Bureau.

Kosmos 36 was launched using a Kosmos-2I 63S1 carrier rocket, which flew from Mayak-2 at Kapustin Yar. The launch occurred at 03:36 GMT on 30 July 1964.

It decayed from orbit on 28 February 1965. Kosmos 36 was the first of seventy nine DS-P1-Yu satellites to be launched, of which all but seven were successful. The next launch of a DS-P1-Yu satellite, the DS-P1-Yu #2 will be on 12 February 1965, failed due to a second stage malfunction.

See also

 1964 in spaceflight

References

Kosmos satellites
1964 in the Soviet Union
1964 in spaceflight
Spacecraft launched in 1964
Dnepropetrovsk Sputnik program